Highscreen is a consumer electronics brand selling budget smartphones in Russia. The brand debuted in the 1990s, when the German computer store Vobis sold fully assembled PCs under the Highscreen brand.

References

Consumer electronics